Svante Stensson Sture or Svante Sture the Younger (born 1 May 1517 in Stockholm, d. 24 May 1567 in the Sture Murders at Uppsala Castle) was a Swedish count, riksmarsk and statesman. From 1562 to 1564, during the Livonian War, he was governor of Estonia.

Family
Svante Sture was the son of Sten Svantesson Sture (d. y.) and Kristina (Christina) Nilsdotter Gyllenstierna. He was married to Märta ("King Martha") Erikdotter Leijonhufvud on 3 March 1538 at Nyköping Castle, with whom he had the following children:

Sigrid Svantesdotter Sture (1538–1613)
Magdalena (Malin) Svantesdotter Sture (1539–1610)
Anna Svantesdotter Sture (1541–1595)
Sten Svantesson Sture (1542–1542)
Nils Svantesson Sture (1543–1567)
Sten Svantesson Sture (1544–1565)
Erik Svantesson Sture (1546–1567)
Margareta Svantesdotter Sture (1547–1617)
Gustaf Svantesson Sture (1548–1548)
Brita Svantesdotter Sture (1550–1550)
Mauritz Svantesson Sture (1552–1592)
Karl Svantesson Sture (1555–1598)
Iliana Svantesdotter Sture (1556–1556)
Iliana Svantesdotter Sture (1557–1557)
Kristina Svantesdotter Sture (1559–1619)

References

Swedish nobility
16th-century Swedish politicians
16th century in Estonia
1517 births
1567 deaths